Khuseyn Uwaisovich Baysangurov (born 6 November 1994) is a Russian professional boxer. He held the WBA Continental (Europe) and the IBF International light-middleweight titles from 2017 to 2018.

Professional career
On 26 August 2017, Baysangurov defeated Estonian boxer Pavel Semjonov for the vacant WBA Continental (Europe) title in Moscow, Russia. He won the fight by technical knockout after Semjonov's corner stopped the bout following the end of the seventh round.

On 2 December, Baysangurov faced German boxer Nick Klappert in a unification bout involving the latter's IBF International title. He won the fight by knockout after Klappert turned his back leading to the referee stopping the bout at 2:39 of the opening round.

On 5 May 2018, Baysangurov is expected to defend his titles against Jose Antonio Villalobos in Baku, Azerbaijan. He knocked down Villalobos in the first round, before winning the bout in the middle of the sixth round when Villabos signaled his corner to throw in the towel.

On 2 October, Baysangurov faced Georgian boxer Malkhaz Sujashvili in Kyiv, Ukraine. He won the fight by technical knockout at 2:50 of the second round.

Personal life
He is the cousin of former WBO and IBO light-middleweight champion Zaurbek Baysangurov.

Professional boxing record

References

External links

1994 births
Living people
Light-middleweight boxers
Russian male boxers
Russian Muslims
Chechen sportsmen
Russian people of Chechen descent